Dead Soul is a rock band, or, as they called themselves, "Dark Electronic Industrial Doom Blues band" from Linköping, Sweden. 
Their first album In the Darkness reached #49 on Swedish Toplist (Sverigetopplistan). 

They have toured frequently with rock band Ghost.

Discography
Studio albums
In the Darkness (2013)
The Sheltering Sky (2015)

References

Swedish musical groups